Charles Wheaton Elam, Sr. (March 18, 1866 - September 5, 1917), was a Democratic politician from his native Mansfield, a small city in DeSoto Parish in northwestern Louisiana, USA.

References

1866 births
1917 deaths
People from Mansfield, Louisiana
Louisiana State University alumni
Louisiana lawyers
Democratic Party members of the Louisiana House of Representatives
19th-century American politicians
19th-century American lawyers
19th-century American Episcopalians